In quantum field theory, the Dirac spinor is the spinor that describes all known fundamental particles that are fermions, with the possible exception of neutrinos. It appears in the plane-wave solution to the Dirac equation, and is a certain combination of two Weyl spinors, specifically, a bispinor that transforms "spinorially" under the action of the Lorentz group.

Dirac spinors are important and interesting in numerous ways. Foremost, they are important as they do describe all of the known fundamental particle fermions in nature; this includes the electron and the quarks. Algebraically they behave, in a certain sense, as the "square root" of a vector. This is not readily apparent from direct examination, but it has slowly become clear over the last 60 years that spinorial representations are fundamental to geometry. For example, effectively all Riemannian manifolds can have spinors and spin connections built upon them, via the Clifford algebra. The Dirac spinor is specific to that of Minkowski spacetime and Lorentz transformations; the general case is quite similar.

This article is devoted to the Dirac spinor in the Dirac representation. This corresponds to a specific representation of the gamma matrices, and is best suited for demonstrating the positive and negative energy solutions of the Dirac equation. There are other representations, most notably the chiral representation, which is better suited for demonstrating the chiral symmetry of the solutions to the Dirac equation. The chiral spinors may be written as linear combinations of the Dirac spinors presented below; thus, nothing is lost or gained, other than a change in perspective with regards to the discrete symmetries of the solutions.

The remainder of this article is laid out in a pedagogical fashion, using notations and conventions specific to the standard presentation of the Dirac spinor in textbooks on quantum field theory. It focuses primarily on the algebra of the plane-wave solutions. The manner in which the Dirac spinor transforms under the action of the Lorentz group is discussed in the article on bispinors.

Definition
The Dirac spinor is the bispinor  in the plane-wave ansatz

of the free Dirac equation for a spinor with mass ,

which, in natural units becomes

and with Feynman slash notation may be written

An explanation of terms appearing in the ansatz is given below.
 The four-momentum of a plane wave is  where  is arbitrary,
These coordinates parametrize Minkowski space. In this article, when  appears in an argument, the index is sometimes omitted.

The Dirac spinor for the positive-frequency solution can be written as

where
  is an arbitrary two-spinor, concretely a  vector.
  is the Pauli vector,
  is the positive square root . For this article, the  subscript is sometimes omitted and the energy simply written .

Derivation from Dirac equation
The Dirac equation has the form

In order to derive an expression for the four-spinor , the matrices  and  must be given in concrete form. The precise form that they take is representation-dependent. For the entirety of this article, the Dirac representation is used. In this representation, the matrices are

These two 4×4 matrices are related to the Dirac gamma matrices.

The next step is to look for solutions of the form

while at the same time splitting  into two two-spinors:

Results
Using all of the above information to plug into the Dirac equation results in

This matrix equation is really two coupled equations:

Note that this solution needs to have  in order for the solution to be valid in a frame where the particle has .

Derivation of the sign of the energy in this case. We consider the potentially problematic term .

 On the other hand, let ,  with  a unit vector, and let .

End derivation.

Assembling these pieces, the full positive energy solution is conventionally written as

The above introduces a normalization factor  derived in the next section.

Solving instead the 1st equation for  a different set of solutions are found:

In this case, one needs to enforce that  for this solution to be valid in a frame where the particle has . The proof follows analogously to the previous case. This is the so-called negative energy solution. It can sometimes become confusing to carry around an explicitly negative energy, and so it is conventional to flip the sign on both the energy and the momentum, and to write this as

In further development, the -type solutions are referred to as the particle solutions, describing a positive-mass spin-1/2 particle carrying positive energy, and the -type solutions are referred to as the antiparticle solutions, again describing a positive-mass spin-1/2 particle, again carrying positive energy. In the laboratory frame, both are considered to have positive mass and positive energy, although they are still very much dual to each other, with the flipped sign on the antiparticle plane-wave suggesting that it is "travelling backwards in time". The interpretation of "backwards-time" is a bit subjective and imprecise, amounting to hand-waving when one's only evidence are these solutions. It does gain stronger evidence when considering the quantized Dirac field. A more precise meaning for these two sets of solutions being "opposite to each other" is given in the section on charge conjugation, below.

Chiral basis 

Spin orientation

Two-spinors 
In the Dirac representation, the most convenient definitions for the two-spinors are:

and

since these form an orthonormal basis with respect to a (complex) inner product.

Pauli matrices
The Pauli matrices are

Using these, one obtains what is sometimes called the Pauli vector:

Orthogonality
The Dirac spinors provide a complete and orthogonal set of solutions to the Dirac equation. This is most easily demonstrated by writing the spinors in the rest frame, where this becomes obvious, and then boosting to an arbitrary Lorentz coordinate frame.  In the rest frame, where the three-momentum vanishes:  one may define four spinors

Introducing the Feynman slash notation

the boosted spinors can be written as 

and

with the derivative understood to be acting towards the left.  The conjugate spinors are then

and

The normalization chosen here is such that the scalar invariant  really is invariant in all Lorentz frames. Specifically, this means

Completeness
The four rest-frame spinors   indicate that there are four distinct, real, linearly independent solutions to the Dirac equation. That they are indeed solutions can be made clear by observing that, when written in momentum space, the Dirac equation has the form

and

This follows because

which in turn follows from the anti-commutation relations for the gamma matrices:

with  the metric tensor in flat space (in curved space, the gamma matrices can be viewed as being a kind of vielbein, although this is beyond the scope of the current article). It is perhaps useful to note that the Dirac equation, written in the rest frame, takes the form

and

so that the rest-frame spinors can correctly be interpreted as solutions to the Dirac equation. There are four equations here, not eight. Although 4-spinors are written as four complex numbers, thus suggesting 8 real variables, only four of them have dynamical independence; the other four have no significance and can always be parameterized away. That is, one could take each of the four vectors   and multiply each by a distinct global phase  This phase changes nothing; it can be interpreted as a kind of global gauge freedom. This is not to say that "phases don't matter", as of course they do; the Dirac equation must be written in complex form, and the phases couple to electromagnetism.  Phases even have a physical significance, as the Aharonov–Bohm effect implies: the Dirac field, coupled to electromagnetism, is a U(1) fiber bundle (the circle bundle), and the Aharonov–Bohm effect demonstrates the holonomy of that bundle. All this has no direct impact on the counting of the number of distinct components of the Dirac field. In any setting, there are only four real, distinct components.

With an appropriate choice of the gamma matrices, it is possible to write the Dirac equation in a purely real form, having only real solutions: this is the Majorana equation. However, it has only two linearly independent solutions. These solutions do not couple to electromagnetism; they describe a massive, electrically neutral spin-1/2 particle. Apparently, coupling to electromagnetism doubles the number of solutions. But of course, this makes sense: coupling to electromagnetism requires taking a real field, and making it complex.  With some effort, the Dirac equation can be interpreted as the "complexified" Majorana equation. This is most easily demonstrated in a generic geometrical setting, outside the scope of this article.

Energy eigenstate projection matrices
Given a fixed Lorentz coordinate frame (i.e. a fixed momentum), these are

These are a pair of 4×4 matrices. They sum to the identity matrix:

are orthogonal

and are idempotent

It is convenient to notice their trace:

Note that the trace, and the orthonormality properties hold independent of the Lorentz frame; these are Lorentz covariants.

Charge conjugation
Charge conjugation transforms the positive-energy spinor into the negative-energy spinor. Charge conjugation is a mapping (an involution)  having the explicit form

In the Dirac representation for the gamma matrices, the matrix  can be written as

Thus, a positive-energy solution (dropping the spin superscript to avoid notational overload)

is carried to its charge conjugate

Note the stray complex conjugates. These can be consolidated with the identity

to obtain

with the 2-spinor being

As this has precisely the form of the negative energy solution, it becomes clear that charge conjugation exchanges the particle and anti-particle solutions. Note that not only is the energy reversed, but the momentum is reversed as well. Spin-up is transmuted to spin-down. It can be shown that the parity is also flipped. Charge conjugation is very much a pairing of Dirac spinor to its "exact opposite".

See also
Dirac equation
Weyl equation
Majorana equation
Helicity basis
Spin(1,3), the double cover of SO(1,3) by a spin group

References

 

Quantum mechanics
Quantum field theory
Spinors
Spinor